BaadAsssss Cinema is a 2002 TV documentary film directed by Isaac Julien.  Julien looks at the Blaxploitation era of the 1970s in this hour-long documentary.

Synopsis

With archive film clips and interviews, this brief look at a frequently overlooked historical period of filmmaking acts as an introduction rather than a complete record. It features interviews with some of the genre's biggest stars, like Fred Williamson, Pam Grier, and Richard Roundtree. Director Melvin Van Peebles discusses the historical importance of his landmark film Sweet Sweetback's Baadasssss Song. For a perspective contemporary to the documentary, director Quentin Tarantino offers his commentary, and author/critic bell hooks provides scholarly social analysis.

The music of Blaxploitation films is discussed, focusing on Curtis Mayfield's Super Fly and Isaac Hayes' Shaft. Interviews with writer/director Larry Cohen and film historian Armond White are also featured. BaadAsssss Cinema was originally shown on the Independent Film Channel in August 2002 as part of a week-long Blaxploitation film festival.

Contributors
Larry Cohen
Ron Finley
Pam Grier
Ed Guerrero
Gloria Hendry
bell hooks
Samuel L. Jackson
Elvis Mitchell
Afeni Shakur
Quentin Tarantino
Melvin Van Peebles
Armond White
Fred Williamson
Isaac Hayes — archive footage
Roy Innis — archive footage
Jesse Jackson — archive footage
Ron O'Neal — archive footage
Gordon Parks — archive footage

Films mentioned
Blacula
Black Belt Jones
Black Caesar
Black Gunn
Coffy 
Foxy Brown
Jackie Brown
The Mack
Original Gangstas
Shaft
Super Fly
Sweet Sweetback's Baadasssss Song

See also
 List of blaxploitation films

References

External links

BaadAsssss Cinema at the Independent Film Channel

2002 documentary films
2002 films
American documentary films
American independent films
Blaxploitation films
Documentary films about African Americans
Documentary films about the cinema of the United States
Films directed by Isaac Julien
2002 independent films
2000s English-language films
2000s American films